The Dakota, Missouri Valley and Western Railroad  started operations in September 1990 operating over 360 miles (580 km) of former Soo Line Railroad track in Montana and North Dakota. The railroad operates approximately 523 miles (893 km) of track. DMVW maintains its headquarters in Bismarck, North Dakota and has field offices in Crosby, North Dakota, Wishek, North Dakota, and Oakes, North Dakota, as well as Britton, South Dakota.

References

External links
Dakota, Missouri Valley and Western Railroad website

North Dakota railroads
South Dakota railroads
Montana railroads
Regional railroads in the United States
Spin-offs of the Canadian Pacific Railway